Karon is an exonym for the following two languages of West Papua, Indonesia:
 Karon Pantai language, or Abun, a language spoken on the north coast of West Papua
 Karon Dori language, spoken further inland from Karon Pantai and generally considered a dialect of Maybrat